The Caleb Gorton House is a historic 18th-century house located in Warwick, Rhode Island.

The Federal style house, a -story five-bay wood-frame structure with a central chimney, was built c. 1790.  It was restored by Steve Tyson, a preservationist who was featured in the film Old House Soul.

The house was listed on the National Register of Historic Places in 1983.

See also
National Register of Historic Places in Kent County, Rhode Island

References

Houses on the National Register of Historic Places in Rhode Island
Houses in Warwick, Rhode Island
National Register of Historic Places in Kent County, Rhode Island
Federal architecture in Massachusetts